Maude Latour is an American singer-songwriter.

Early life and education 
Latour was born in Sweden. Her father is Almar Latour, former executive editor of The Wall Street Journal and CEO of Dow Jones & Company, and her mother is a journalist for S&P Global. She lived in London and attended Hong Kong International School before attending the Brearley School in Manhattan. Latour graduated from Columbia University in 2022 as a philosophy major.

Career 
Latour began songwriting at 15 and uploading her music to Spotify at 17. She released her first EP, High School High, in 2018, however it has been taken off streaming platforms. She released her second EP, Starsick, in 2019, which includes songs such as “Superfruit”, “Shoot and Run”, and “Lovesick”

Latour is currently signed to Warner Records. She released her breakout single, "One More Weekend" in July 2020 and it has amassed over 29 million streams on Spotify. Latour released her second EP Strangers Forever in October 2021 and in the spring of 2022 she headlined her first tour, performing in 13 cities across North America.

In 2022, Latour released singles "Headphones", "Lola", and "Trees". She performed at Lollapalooza in July 2022. Ahead of the festival, she released a new single, "Probabilities". In addition to headlining her "What is This Feeling?" tour, Latour performed at multiple music festivals in the fall, including Austin City Limits Music Festival, All Things Go Fall Classic, and Music Midtown.

On September 16, 2022, Latour shared on Instagram that she covered Kim Wilde's "Kids in America" for the 2022 Netflix film Do Revenge. Three days later, Latour announced her newest EP, 001, was to be released on September 30, 2022.  On 001, 2 new songs were released, "001" and "Living It". Later on December 9, 2022 a new song "Reality television" was added to 001.

Discography

EPs

Singles

References 

Living people
Year of birth missing (living people)
American pop musicians
Columbia College (New York) alumni
Brearley School alumni
Warner Records artists
21st-century American singers
21st-century American women singers
American indie pop musicians
American people of Dutch descent